Bernard Monroe "Barney" Stitt, (October 17, 1880 – March 21, 1942), was a Canadian politician.

He was born in Spencerville, Ontario. He moved to The Pas, Manitoba in 1909 and worked as a forest engineer. He enlisted in the Canadian Expeditionary Force during World War I and served in Europe.

Returning to The Pas after the war he served as mayor from 1921 to 1930 when he was elected to the House of Commons of Canada in the 1930 federal election representing Nelson for the Conservatives. He ran in the 1935 federal election in the redistributed riding of Churchill but was defeated by Liberal Thomas Crerar.

After leaving politics, he became a hotel owner.

External links

Manitoba History Society biography

1880 births
1942 deaths
Conservative Party of Canada (1867–1942) MPs
Members of the House of Commons of Canada from Manitoba
Canadian military personnel of World War I
People from The Pas